Andréas J. Fierens (8 February 1898 – 12 January 1971) was a Belgian football (soccer) player who competed in the 1920 Summer Olympics. He was a member of the Belgium team, which won the gold medal in the football tournament.

References

External links
 André Fierens' profile at databaseOlympics
 
 

1898 births
1971 deaths
Belgian footballers
Footballers at the 1920 Summer Olympics
Footballers at the 1924 Summer Olympics
Olympic footballers of Belgium
Olympic gold medalists for Belgium
Belgium international footballers
Olympic medalists in football
Medalists at the 1920 Summer Olympics
Association football midfielders
20th-century Belgian people